OO or oo may refer to:

Art and entertainment 
 OO (EP), album by South Korean singer Zion.T
 OO, the production code for the 1967 Doctor Who serial The Ice Warriors
 "O.O" (song), a song by South Korean girl group NMIXX

Places 
 Oô, a commune in France
 Oo, Indonesia

Science and technology 
 ʻŌʻō, an extinct bird of the genus Moho
 Object-oriented programming, a computer programming paradigm
 O.O (also O.o or o.O), an emoticon to represent two eyes and a nose or mouth

Transportation 
 SkyWest Airlines (IATA code: OO)
 Belgium (aircraft registration prefix: OO)
 Old Oak Common TMD, a carriage shed (Network Rail depot code: OO)

Other uses 
 Oo (digraph), a digraph in orthography
 Oo, a component of Burmese names
 ‘O‘o stick, a traditional Hawaiian digging bar
 Original Oratory, a competitive event in high school forensic competitions
 Oakley, Inc. (NYSE stock ticker symbol: OO), subsidiary of Italian company Luxottica
 OO gauge, a 1:76.2 modelling scale in model railroading
 Official Observer, an appointed amateur radio operator
 Orange Order, a protestant fraternal order based in Northern Ireland

See also 
 Double-O, producer and half of hip-hop duo o in the Hallo
 Infinity symbol (∞)
 00 (disambiguation)
 O0 (disambiguation)
 OOO (disambiguation)
 ᅇ, an obsolete unit of the Hangul alphabet
 0-0 (disambiguation)
 ⚭, marriage symbol
 ⱺ, a phonetic character